Timo Kielich (born 5 August 1999) is a Belgian cyclist, who currently rides for UCI Continental team  in road cycling, and UCI Cyclo-cross team IKO–Crelan in cyclo-cross. He won the bronze medal at the 2021 UCI Cyclo-cross Under-23 World Championships.

Major results

Cyclo-cross

2015–2016
 Junior Soudal Classics
2nd GP Hasselt
2016–2017
 Junior DVV Trophy
2nd Koppenbergcross
3rd Azencross
 3rd  UEC European Junior Championships
 UCI Junior World Cup
3rd Hoogerheide
 3rd National Junior Championships
 3rd Druivencross Juniors
2018–2019
 1st  National Under-23 Championships
 1st Druivencross Under-23
 Under-23 DVV Trophy
1st Flandriencross
2nd Scheldecross
2nd Azencross
2nd Jaarmarktcross
 2nd Geraardsbergen Under-23
 UCI Under-23 World Cup
3rd Heusden-Zolder
2019–2020
 2nd  UEC European Under-23 Championships
 Under-23 DVV Trophy
2nd Grand Prix Sven Nys
2nd Azencross
3rd Flandriencross
3rd Kortrijk
3rd Brussels Universities
2020–2021
 3rd  UCI World Under-23 Championships

Road
2020
 9th Grand Prix d'Isbergues
2021
 3rd Overall Tour of Bulgaria
1st Stage 5
 4th Overall Tour d'Eure-et-Loir
2022
 1st  Overall Course de Solidarność et des Champions Olympiques
1st Stage 2
 6th Antwerp Port Epic
 10th Heistse Pijl
2023
 3rd Grand Prix de Denain
 4th Nokere Koerse

Mountain Bike
2016
 1st  Cross-country, National Junior Championships
2018
 1st  Cross-country, National Under-23 Championships
2019
 1st  Cross-country, National Under-23 Championships
2020
 1st  Marathon, National Championships

References

External links

Timo Kielich at Cyclocross 24

1999 births
Living people
Belgian male cyclists
Cyclo-cross cyclists
People from Sint-Truiden
Cyclists from Limburg (Belgium)